Dairon Alberto Blanco Joseph (2 October 1992 – 16 November 2020) was a Cuban footballer who played as a midfielder.

Career
Born in Amancio, Blanco played club football for Las Tunas and in Uruguay for Canelones del Este.

He was a member of the Cuba national team between 2012 and 2016, earning 7 caps.

He died on 16 November 2020, aged 28, in a car accident in Cienfuegos.

References

1992 births
2020 deaths
Cuban footballers
Cuba international footballers
FC Las Tunas players
Association football midfielders
Cuban expatriate footballers
Cuban expatriate sportspeople in Uruguay
Expatriate footballers in Uruguay
Road incident deaths in Cuba
People from Las Tunas Province